Land is a Swedish weekly family magazine with a countryside focus. The magazine was established in 1971. The headquarters of the magazine is in Stockholm. It is published by the Federation of Swedish Farmers (LRF) and is distributed to all members of LRF. Eva Källström is the editor-in-chief of Land.

In 2009 Land was one of the best-selling Swedish magazines with a circulation of 224,000 copies.

References

External links
 Land at LRF Media website 

1971 establishments in Sweden
Lifestyle magazines
Magazines established in 1971
Magazines published in Stockholm
Swedish-language magazines
Weekly magazines published in Sweden